Fuzhou or Fu Prefecture (鄜州) was a zhou (prefecture) in imperial China, centering on modern Fu County, Shaanxi, China. It existed (intermittently) from 554 until 1913.

Geography
The administrative region of Fuzhou in the Tang dynasty is in modern Yan'an in Shaanxi. It probably includes parts of modern: 
Fu County
Ganquan County
Luochuan County

References
 

Prefectures of the Sui dynasty
Prefectures of the Tang dynasty
Prefectures of the Song dynasty
Prefectures of Later Liang (Five Dynasties)
Prefectures of Later Tang
Prefectures of Later Jin (Five Dynasties)
Prefectures of Later Han (Five Dynasties)
Prefectures of Later Zhou
Prefectures of the Jin dynasty (1115–1234)
Prefectures of the Yuan dynasty
Subprefectures of the Ming dynasty
Departments of the Qing dynasty
Former prefectures in Shaanxi
Populated places established in the 6th century
554 establishments
1913 disestablishments in China
6th-century establishments in China